Top Man (also known as Man of the Family) is a 1943 American black-and-white film directed by Charles Lamont and starring Donald O'Connor, Susanna Foster, Lillian Gish, Richard Dix, and Peggy Ryan. It was O'Connor and Ryan's first film away from the third of their trio, Gloria Jean.

References

External links

1943 films
1943 musical comedy films
American black-and-white films
Universal Pictures films
Films directed by Charles Lamont
Films scored by Frank Skinner
American musical comedy films
1940s English-language films
1940s American films